The Securities and Commodities Authority (SCA) is a federal financial regulatory agency in the United Arab Emirates.  It was established based on Federal Decree No. (4) of 2000 by then-president of the UAE, Khalifa Bin Zayed Al Nahyan and it's amendments issued in Federal Law 25 of 2006, amending the former law. 

The authority is a federal government agency, which is financially and administratively independent, headed by a CEO and a chairman of a board of directors, both appointed by the President of the UAE. The main objective of the authority is to supervise and monitor financial markets in the UAE, including the Dubai Financial Market and the Abu Dhabi Securities Exchange. However, it is not responsible for regulating financial activity in free economic zones such as the Dubai International Financial Centre, which are regulated by independent laws and courts such as the DIFC Courts.

History 
The Securities and Commodities Authority (SCA) was established by Federal Law No. (4) of 2000 enacted by Zayed bin Sultan Al Nahyan as the first legislation for securities in the UAE and was initially named Emirates Securities & Commodities Authority and Market. The first two exchange markets, the Abu Dhabi Securities Exchange and the Dubai Financial Market would be founded shortly after in the same year. 

In 2004, Dubai established the Dubai Financial Services Authority, which would be the sole regulatory authority for the economic free zone of Dubai International Financial Centre, which included independent exchanges such as Nasdaq Dubai outside of the control of the SCA.

In 2006, UAE president Khalifa bin Zayed Al Nahyan issued Law 25 of 2006 amending certain provisions of the prior law, removing the requirement of the board of directors to represent various governmental departments and the reducing the board of directors from 8 board members to 5 and expanding the requirement for board members to declare any securities or stock they own, or stock owned by the board member's family and minor children.

Organisational structure 
The SCA is regulated by UAE Federal Decree 4 of 2000 and is granted some autonomy from the UAE Ministry of Finance, to which it reports. The SCA has the right to issue regulations, frameworks, and guidelines according to federal law or executive instruction. The SCA is governed by a chief executive officer that handles the day-to-day management of the authority, and a board of directors chaired by the minister of finance. The minister of finance, acting as chairman, and the chief executive would jointly appoint the remaining 5 members of the board of directors, who would serve a four-year term renewable once. The authority prevents any of the board members from acting in a similar capacity with any financial broker or public company.  

The SCA is organised into departments that report to the chief executive, which include:
 Supervision Department
 Issues and Disclosure Department
 Human Resources and Financial Affairs Department
 Research and Technical Support Department
 Commodities Department 
 Enforcement Department

See also
 Dubai Gold & Commodities Exchange
 Dubai Financial Market

References

External links
 "Securities and Commodities Authority"

Government agencies of the United Arab Emirates
Government agencies established in 2000
Financial regulatory authorities of the United Arab Emirates
Regulation in the United Arab Emirates